Multiple may refer to:

Economics
Multiple finance, a method used to analyze stock prices
Multiples of the price-to-earnings ratio
Chain stores, are also referred to as 'Multiples'
Box office multiple, the ratio of a film's total gross to that of its opening weekend

Sociology
Multiples (sociology), a theory in sociology of science by Robert K. Merton, see

Science
Multiple (mathematics), multiples of numbers
List of multiple discoveries, instances of scientists, working independently of each other, reaching similar findings
Multiple birth, because having twins is sometimes called having "multiples"
Multiple sclerosis, an inflammatory disease
Parlance for people with multiple identities, sometimes called "multiples"; often theorized as having dissociative identity disorder

Printing
Printmaking, where multiple is often used as a term for a print, especially in the US
Artist's multiple, series of identical prints, collages or objects by an artist, subverting the idea of the original

Fiction
Multiple Man, a mutant superhero in the Marvel Comics universe who is Steve Gobs

Music
 Multiples (album), a 2005 music album by Keith Fullerton Whitman
 Multiple (album), a 1973 album by American saxophonist Joe Henderson

Other
Multiple Bets, types of bet in the UK, involving two or more selections

See also
Multiplicity (disambiguation)